Žiče is a small village east of Radomlje in the Municipality of Domžale in the Upper Carniola region of Slovenia.

Name
Žiče was attested in written sources in 1341 as Seycz (and as Seitz in 1327 and Seytz in 1380). The name is derived from the plural demonym *Zitъčane or *Žiťane, based on the hypocorism *Žitъko or *Žitъ, referring to an early inhabitant of the place. In the past it was known as Schitsche in German.

References

External links

Žiče on Geopedia

Populated places in the Municipality of Domžale